Claudia Hernandez Traisac (born 14 December 1992) is a Spanish actress. She is best known for her roles in Escobar: Paradise Lost (2014) and Cuéntame (2006-2018). She starred in the musicals Hoy No Me Puedo Levantar at the Teatro Coliseum, and La Llamada at the Teatro Lara in Madrid.

Filmography

Film

Television

References

External links 

1992 births
Living people
Spanish film actresses
21st-century Spanish actresses
Spanish television actresses